Mambusao, officially the Municipality of Mambusao (Capiznon/Hiligaynon: Banwa sang Mambusao), is a 3rd class municipality in the province of Capiz, Philippines. According to the 2020 census, it has a population of 40,690 people.

Its economy is based on agriculture with rice and coconut as the primary products and crops. The annual festival of Mambusao is called "Inilusan" honoring of St. Catherine of Alexandria, the patron saint of the town, celebrated every November 25. Inilusan literally means sharing of dish by neighbors.

Mambusao is the home of the Villareal family, the most famous of whom is Speaker Cornelio "Agurang Coni" Villareal and Governor Cornelio "Dodoy" Villareal. It is also the birthplace of the late Filipino diplomat and politician Roy Señeres.

Geography

Barangays
Mambusao is politically subdivided into 26 barangays.

Climate

Demographics

Economy

References

External links
 [ Philippine Standard Geographic Code]
Philippine Census Information

Municipalities of Capiz